Tarozzi is an Italian surname. Notable people with the surname include:

Andrea Tarozzi (born 1973), Italian footballer and manager
Mattia Tarozzi (born 1991), Italian motorcycle racer

Italian-language surnames